The 2015–16 season was Società Sportiva Lazio's 116th since their founding and the club's 28th consecutive season in the topflight of Italian football. The club competed in Serie A, the Coppa Italia, the UEFA Champions League, and the UEFA Europa League. Having finished 3rd the previous season, Lazio began in the play-off round but failed to qualify after a 3–1 loss on aggregate against Bayer Leverkusen.

Players

Squad information

Transfers

In

Loans in

Out

Loans out

Pre-season and friendlies

Competitions

Supercoppa Italiana

Serie A

League table

Results summary

Results by round

Matches

Coppa Italia

UEFA Champions League

Play-off round

UEFA Europa League

Group stage

Knockout phase

Round of 32

Round of 16

Statistics

Appearances and goals

|-
! colspan="14" style="background:#B2FFFF; text-align:center"| Goalkeepers

|-
! colspan="14" style="background:#B2FFFF; text-align:center"| Defenders

|-
! colspan="14" style="background:#B2FFFF; text-align:center"| Midfielders

|-
! colspan="14" style="background:#B2FFFF; text-align:center"| Forwards

|-
! colspan="14" style="background:#B2FFFF; text-align:center"| Players transferred out during the season

Goalscorers

Last updated: 15 May 2016

Clean sheets

Last updated: 1 May 2016

References

S.S. Lazio seasons
Lazio
Lazio
Lazio